Story of Things is a 2023 Indian Tamil-language anthology streaming series consisting of five episodes directed by George K Antoney. Produced by Chutzpah Films. The series stars  Vinoth Kishan, Anshita Anand, Aditi Balan, Gautami Tadimalla, Arjun Radhakrishnan, Shanthnu Bhagyaraj, Sidhique KM, Archana, Bharath Niwas, Linga, Ritika Singh, Roju. The music was composed by Madley Blues. The cinematography was handled by Harshvardhan Waghdhare. The editing was done by George K Antoney.  The series was released at SonyLIV on January 06, 2023.

Episodes

Cast

Music 
The Original Series soundtrack is composed by Madley Blues

Release 
The series was released at SonyLIV on January 06, 2023.

References

External links 
 
 Story of Things at SonyLIV

SonyLIV original programming
Tamil-language web series
Tamil-language anthology television series
2023 Tamil-language television series debuts